Wigmore High School is a mixed secondary school in Wigmore, in the county of Herefordshire, England.

Previously a foundation school, in 2007 Wigmore High School federated with Wigmore Primary School, and now includes nursery school provision. In 2011 the federation converted to academy status. The other main feeder primary schools to Wigmore High School are Kingsland Primary School, Leintwardine Endowed CE Primary School, Orleton CE Primary School, Shobdon Primary School and St Mary's CE Primary School in Bucknell, Shropshire.

References

External links
Wigmore High School official website

Secondary schools in Herefordshire
Academies in Herefordshire